Lune may refer to:

Rivers
River Lune, in Lancashire and Cumbria, England
River Lune, Durham, in County Durham, England
Lune (Weser), a 43 km-long tributary of the Weser in Germany
Lune River (Tasmania), in south-eastern Tasmania, Australia

Place names
Lune Aqueduct, east of the city of Lancaster in Lancashire, England
Lune Forest, Site of Special Scientific Interest in Cumbria, England
Lune River, Tasmania, Australia, a town near the mouth of the river of the same name
Lüne, a former village near Lüneburg in Saxony where Charlemagne mustered his troops against the Avars

Mathematics
 Lune (geometry), a 2-dimensional arc-defined convex-concave area
 Lune of Hippocrates, in geometry, a plane region bounded by arcs of circles and amenable to quadrature
 Spherical lune, a 3-dimensional lune

People
Ted Lune (born 1920), British actor, played Private Len Bone in the TV series The Army Game
Dragutin Jovanović-Lune (1892–1932), nicknamed Lune (Луне), Serbian guerrilla fighter, officer, politician, delegate and mayor of Vrnjci

Films
Moon (2020 film), a short film by Zoé Pelchat
Lune (2021 film), a 2021 feature film by Arturo Pérez Torres and Aviva Armour-Ostroff

Ships
French ship Lune (1641), 38-gun ship of the line of the French Royal Navy
PS Lune (1892), paddle steamer passenger vessel operated from 1892 to 1913

Fictional places and characters
Lhûn or River Lune in J. R. R. Tolkien's Middle-earth legendarium
Gulf of Lune, also from J. R. R. Tolkien's Middle-earth legendarium
King Lune, a fictional character in The Horse and His Boy in The Chronicles of Narnia
Misha Arsellec Lune, a fictional character from Ar tonelico: Melody of Elemia

Other uses
Lune (poetry), a fixed-form variant of haiku in English
 La Lune, a former French newspaper
 LuneOS, a Linux-based mobile operating system

See also
Lüne Abbey, in Lüneburg, Germany
Loon (disambiguation)
Luna (disambiguation)
Luning (disambiguation)
Lunula (disambiguation)
Lunette (disambiguation)